Torre Millenium is a skyscraper in Sabadell, Catalonia, Spain. Completed in 2002, has 22 floors and rises 90 metres. Lies near other two skyscrapers: Paddock Bulevard and Les Orenetes de l'Eix.

See also 

 List of tallest buildings and structures in Barcelona

References 

Skyscraper office buildings in Barcelona
Buildings and structures completed in 2002
2002 establishments in Spain